Cape Radstock is a headland located on the west coast of Eyre Peninsula in South Australia about  south south-east of the town of Streaky Bay and about  south east of Point Labatt. The cape is both the north western extremity of Anxious Bay and the southern extremity of the Calca Peninsula. It was named by Matthew Flinders on 9 February 1802 after William Waldegrave, 1st Baron Radstock. Since 2012, the waters adjoining its shoreline are within a habitat protection zone in the West Coast Bays Marine Park.

References

r
Eyre Peninsula
Great Australian Bight